is an autobahn in Germany. It runs largely parallel to the Bundesstraße 5; its main purpose is to connect the hinterland of Hamburg. North of Heide, the A 23 becomes B 5 and connects Eiderstedt, Husum and the ferries to the islands of Nordfriesland to the autobahn network.

Exit list 

 Husum

 

|}

External links 

23
A023
A023